Zavitz is a surname. Notable people with the surname include:

Edmund Zavitz (1875–1968), Canadian conservationist
James Zavitz (1922–2017), Canadian sport shooter
Lee Zavitz (1904–1977), American special effects technician
Lucy Zavitz (born 2002), American who formerly lived in an apartment above a grocery store,
Sherman Zavitz (born 1940), Canadian historian